The Biu–Mandara or Central Chadic languages of the Afro-Asiatic family are spoken in Nigeria, Chad and Cameroon.

A reconstruction of Proto-Central Chadic has been proposed by Gravina (2014).

Languages

Gravina (2014)
Gravina (2014) classifies Central Chadic as follows, as part of a reconstruction of the proto-language. Letters and numbers in parentheses correspond to branches in previous classifications. The greatest changes are breaking up and reassigning the languages of the old Mafa branch (A.5) and Mandage (Kotoko) branch (B.1).

South
South
Bata (A.8)
Bata Proper: Bacama, Bata, Fali, Gude, Gudu, Holma (†), Jimi, Ngwaba (from A.1 Tera), Nzanyi, Sharwa
Tsuvan: Tsuvan, Zizilivakan
Daba (A.7)
Daba Proper: Daba, Mazagway Hidi
Mina: Mina, Mbudum
Buwal: Buwal, Gavar
Mafa (= South A.5 Mafa (d)): Mafa, Mefele, Cuvok
Tera (A.1): 
East Tera: Boga, Ga'anda, Hwana
(West Tera): Jara, Tera
Sukur (A.6)
Hurza
Hurza (from A.5 Mafa): Vame, Mbuko
North
Margi–Mandara–Mofu
Margi (A.2)
Bura: Bura, Cibak, Putai, Nggwahyi
Margi Proper: Kilba, Margi South, Margi
Mandara (A.4):
Wandala: Mandara (Malgwa), Glavda
Dghwede: Cineni, Dghwede, Guduf, Gava, Gvoko
Podoko: Podoko, Matal (from A.5 Mafa)
Mofu (part of South A.5 Mafa)
Tokombere: Ouldeme, Mada, Muyang, Molokwo
Meri: Zulgo, Gemzek, Merey, Dugwor
Mofu Proper: Mofu North, Mofu-Gudur
Maroua
Maroua (part of South A.5 Mafa (c)): Giziga North, Giziga South, Mbazla
Lamang
Lamang (West A.4 Wandala): Lamang, Hdi, Mabas
Higi
Higi (A.3): Bana, Hya, Psikyɛ, Kamwe, Kirya-Konzel
Musgum – North Kotoko
Kotoko Island: Buduma
Kotoko North: Mpade, Afaɗə, Malgbe, Maltam
Musgum (B.2): Musgum, Mbara, Muskum (†)
Kotoko Centre
Kotoko Centre: Lagwan, Mser
Kotoko South
Kotoko South: Zina, Mazera
Gidar

Jilbe was not classified, as no sources were available.

Blench (2006)
The branches of Biu–Mandara traditionally go by either names or letters and numbers in an outline format. Blench (2006) organizes them as follows:

Tera (A.1): Tera, Pidlimdi (Hinna), Jara, Ga'anda, Gabin, Boga, Ngwaba, Hwana
Bura–Higi
Bura (A.2): Bura-Pabir (Bura), Cibak (Kyibaku), Nggwahyi, Huba (Kilba), Putai (Marghi West), Marghi Central (Margi, Margi Babal), Marghi South
? Kofa
Higi (A.3): Kamwə (Psikyɛ, Higi), Bana, Hya, ? Kirya-Konzəl
Wandala–Mafa
Wandala (Mandara) (A.4)
East: Wandala (Mura, Mandara, Malgwa), Glavda (Gəlvaxdaxa) 
Parəkwa (Podoko)
West: Gəvoko, Guduf-Gava (Cineni), Dghweɗe, Hdi (Xədi, Hedi, Tur), Lamang, Woga, Vemgo, Mabas
Sukur (Sakwun, A.6)
Mafa (A.5)
Northeast Mafa: Vame (Pəlasla), Mbuko, Gaduwa
Matal (Muktele)
South Mafa
(a) Wuzlam (Ouldémé), Muyang, Maɗa, Məlokwo
(b) Zəlgwa-Minew, Gemzek, Ɗugwor, Mikere, Merey
(c) North Giziga, South Giziga, North Mofu, Mofu-Gudur (South Mofu), Baldemu (Mbazlam)
(d) Cuvok, Mafa, Mefele, Shügule
Daba (A.7)
North Daba: Buwal (Gadala), Gavar (Kortchi)
South Daba: Mina (Besleri, Hina), Daba (Mazagway), Mbədam
Bata (Gbwata) (A.8): Bacama, Bata (Gbwata), Sharwa, Tsuvan, Gude, Fali of Mubi, Zizilivakan (Ulan Mazhilvən, Fali of Jilbu), Jimi (Jimjimən), Gudu, Holma (†), Nzanyi
Mandage (Kotoko) (B.1)
South Mandage: Msər (Kousseri), Lagwan (Logone)
? Jilbe
North Mandage: Afaɗə, Maslam, Malgbe (Gulfey), Mpadə
Buduma (Yedina)
East–Central
Gidar (Kaɗa)
Munjuk (B.2): Mbara, Muskum (Muzuk) (†), Mpus, Beege (Jafga), Vulum (Mulwi)
Mida'a (< B.1): Jina, Majəra

Newman (1977)
Central Chadic classification per Newman (1977):

Names and locations (Nigeria)
Below is a list of language names, populations, and locations (in Nigeria only) from Blench (2019).

South

North

Numerals
Comparison of numerals in individual languages:

See also
List of Proto-Central Chadic reconstructions (Wiktionary)

Notes

References
 Central Chadic resources at africanlanguages.org

Chadic languages
Biu-Mandara languages